John W. Lehman (born August 2, 1945) is an American educator and politician from Racine, Wisconsin. Lehman represented the 21st District in the Wisconsin Senate from 2007 to 2011 and again from 2012 to 2015, and was the Democratic nominee for Lieutenant Governor of Wisconsin in 2014. Previously, Lehman was a member of the Wisconsin State Assembly from 1997 through 2007. Elected as a state senator in 2006 but unseated in 2010, Lehman retook his old seat in the 2012 Wisconsin recall elections, defeating the incumbent, Van Wanggaard, who won the seat back in the 2014 general election.

Background
Born in Rhinelander, Wisconsin, Lehman graduated from Washington Park High School in Racine, Wisconsin. He received his bachelor's degree from Luther College and his master's degree from Carthage College. He also went to the University of Wisconsin–Madison and University of Wisconsin–Parkside. He taught history and economics at Washington Park High School.

Political career
Lehman was elected to the Racine City Council in 1988.  In 1996 he ran for and won election in the 62nd assembly district in a vacancy created when incumbent Kimberly Plache defeated 21st district state senator George Petak in a recall election. Lehman gave up his City Council seat in 2000. In 2006 the 21st state senate district was again an open seat, Lehman ran and defeated Republican Bill McReynolds. Lehman lost his senate seat in the 2010 wave election.

On January 31, 2012, Lehman announced he would run against Wanggaard in what then was "looking like" a probable recall election. He stated "we need a change in course in this state and we need it now" before a gathering of about 20 supporters at the Racine Public Library, where he made the announcement. He added that "we need real leadership in Madison." Volunteers and workers gathered more than 24,000 signatures to recall Wanggaard, one of four state Senators facing a recall along with the Republican Governor Scott Walker and the Republican Lieutenant Governor Rebecca Kleefisch.

Lehman claimed he was "not seeking payback" against Wanggaard for the 2010 election, but claimed Wanggaard had not represented Racine County well in the Senate. The Senate Minority Leader Mark F. Miller (D-Monona) stated that the Democrats "could not have done better" because "they" (meaning Lehman, state Rep. Donna Seidel, who would run against current Senator Pam Galloway in the Wausau district, and former state Rep. Kristen Dexter against Senator Terry Moulton in the Chippewa Falls district) "are folks that people have voted for before." On June 6, 2012, Lehman narrowly defeated Wangaard, giving Democrats a brief one vote majority in the Wisconsin State Senate.

On November 18, 2013, Lehman announced that he would not seek re-election, and instead launched a campaign for Lieutenant Governor in the 2014 Wisconsin gubernatorial election. On August 12, 2014, he won the Democratic nomination, defeating Mary Jo Walters. Lehman and his running-mate, gubernatorial candidate Mary Burke, lost the general election to incumbents Scott Walker and Rebecca Kleefisch.

In 2018, Lehman announced that he would run for election again for the open seat in the 62nd Assembly District, which had been redrawn in 2011 into a safe Republican district.  Lehman was defeated by Racine Unified School Board President Robert Wittke in the 2018 general election.

Electoral history

Wisconsin Assembly (1996-2004)

| colspan="6" style="text-align:center;background-color: #e9e9e9;"| Primary Election

| colspan="6" style="text-align:center;background-color: #e9e9e9;"| General Election

| colspan="6" style="text-align:center;background-color: #e9e9e9;"| Primary Election

| colspan="6" style="text-align:center;background-color: #e9e9e9;"| General Election

| colspan="6" style="text-align:center;background-color: #e9e9e9;"| Primary Election

| colspan="6" style="text-align:center;background-color: #e9e9e9;"| General Election

| colspan="6" style="text-align:center;background-color: #e9e9e9;"| Primary Election

| colspan="6" style="text-align:center;background-color: #e9e9e9;"| General Election

| colspan="6" style="text-align:center;background-color: #e9e9e9;"| Primary Election

| colspan="6" style="text-align:center;background-color: #e9e9e9;"| General Election

Wisconsin Senate (2006, 2010, 2012)

| colspan="6" style="text-align:center;background-color: #e9e9e9;"| Primary Election

| colspan="6" style="text-align:center;background-color: #e9e9e9;"| General Election

| colspan="6" style="text-align:center;background-color: #e9e9e9;"| Primary Election

| colspan="6" style="text-align:center;background-color: #e9e9e9;"| General Election

| colspan="6" style="text-align:center;background-color: #e9e9e9;"| Primary Election

| colspan="6" style="text-align:center;background-color: #e9e9e9;"| General Election

Wisconsin Lieutenant Governor (2014)

Wisconsin Assembly (2018)

| colspan="6" style="text-align:center;background-color: #e9e9e9;"| Primary Election

| colspan="6" style="text-align:center;background-color: #e9e9e9;"| General Election

References

External links
21st Senate District Website Wisconsin State Legislature official site
 

Democratic Party Wisconsin state senators
Democratic Party members of the Wisconsin State Assembly
American Lutherans
Politicians from Racine, Wisconsin
People from Rhinelander, Wisconsin
Educators from Wisconsin
Carthage College alumni
Luther College (Iowa) alumni
University of Wisconsin–Madison alumni
University of Wisconsin–Parkside alumni
1945 births
Living people
21st-century American politicians